This is a list of affiliates of the Trinity Broadcasting Network, a religious television network founded by Paul and Jan Crouch. All stations listed here are owned and operated directly by TBN or owned by TBN subsidiary Community Educational Television, unless otherwise noted. Most of the stations also carry programming from TBN Inspire, Positiv, TBN Enlace USA, and Smile on separate subchannels.

Affiliates
Notes:
1) Stations indicated by two plus signs ("++") are stations that were signed on by TBN or a TBN subsidiary.
2) Stations indicated by two asterisks ("**") represent a station owned by Community Educational Television, a TBN subsidiary.
 Bold O&O stations by Trinity Broadcasting Network.

References

External links
Official website

Religious television
Trinity Broadcasting Network